The Plexippini are a tribe of jumping spiders (Salticidae). They have also been treated as the subfamily Plexippinae.

Genera
Wayne Maddison in 2015 placed the following genera in the tribe:

Afrobeata Caporiacco, 1941
Anarrhotus Simon, 1902
Artabrus Simon, 1902
Baryphas Simon, 1902
Bianor Peckham & Peckham, 1886
Brancus Simon, 1902
Burmattus Prószyński, 1992
Dasycyptus Simon, 1902
Dexippus Thorell, 1891
Eburneana Wesołowska & Szűts, 2001
Encymachus Simon, 1902
Epeus Peckham & Peckham, 1886
Evarcha Simon, 1902
Habronattus F.O. P.-Cambridge, 1901
Harmochirus Simon, 1885
Hermotimus Simon, 1903
Hyllus C.L. Koch, 1846
Iranattus Prószyński, 1992
Microbianor Logunov, 2000
Modunda Simon, 1901
Monomotapa Wesołowska, 2000 – now included in Iranattus
Napoca Simon, 1901
Neaetha Simon, 1884
Nigorella Wesołowska & Tomasiewicz, 2008
Pachyonomastus Caporiacco, 1947
Pancorius Simon, 1902
Parajotus Peckham & Peckham, 1903
Paraneaetha Denis, 1947
Paraplexippus Franganillo, 1930
Pellenes Simon, 1876
Pellolessertia Strand, 1929
Pharacocerus Simon, 1902
Plexippoides Prószyński, 1984
Plexippus C.L. Koch, 1846
Polemus Simon, 1902
Pseudamycus Simon, 1885
Pseudoplexippus Caporiacco, 1947
Ptocasius Simon, 1885
Schenkelia Lessert, 1927
Sibianor Logunov, 2001
Taivala Peckham & Peckham, 1907
Telamonia Thorell, 1887
Thyene Simon, 1885
Vailimia Kammerer, 2006
Yaginumaella Prószyński, 1979
Erasinus Simon, 1899

References

Salticidae